The Ethics and Anti-Corruption Commission (EACC) was established after Kenya’s President Mwai Kibaki signed the Ethics and Anti-Corruption Act on 29 August 2011. The EACC replaced the Kenya Anti-Corruption Commission (KACC).

Establishment
The country's Parliament disbanded KACC on 24 August 2011, in line with the requirements for change as stipulated in the new Constitutional dispensation after the promulgation of the 2010 Constitution.

The EACC was established on 5 September 2011 and Commissioners Irene Keino and Prof. Jane K. Onsongo appointed on 11 May 2012 to head the anti-graft agency.

Chairman Mumo Matemu was nominated by the Grand Coalition principals, President Mwai Kibaki and Prime Minister Raila Odinga in 2012 to head the anti-graft agency alongside commissioners Irene Keino and Prof. Jane Onsongo.

The three have since resigned concurrently amid controversy in between April–May 2015.

In November 2015, President Uhuru Kenyatta nominated new members to head the agency. Philip Kinusu as the commission's chairperson alongside four other officials as commissioners. The commissioners are Dabar Maalim, Paul Gachoka, Sophia Lepuchirit and Rose Macharia

The Commission Secretary - HALAKHE DIDA WAQO is in charge of the day-to-day operations. Mr. Halakhe D. Waqo formally took office at the Ethics and Anti-Corruption Commission (EACC) after a swearing-in ceremony held at the Supreme Court of Kenya, on 21 January 2013.

By doing so, he becomes the commission's first Secretary/Chief Executive Officer since EACC was established to replace the Kenya Anti-Corruption Commission in 2012.

He is deputised by:

Mr. Michael Mubea (Deputy Secretary/Chief Executive Officer – Operations) whom joined the commission in 2013.

See also
 Corruption in Kenya
 Kenya Anti-Corruption Authority
 Kenya Anti-Corruption Commission

References

External links 
 - Ethics and Anti-Corruption Commission

Politics of Kenya
Government agencies of Kenya
2012 in Kenya
Law of Kenya
Kenya articles by importance
Corruption in Kenya
Anti-corruption agencies